Bory is a village and municipality in the Levice District in the Nitra Region of south-west Slovakia.

History
In historical records the village was first mentioned in 1135. The village belonged to the noble family Bory de Bori és Borfői after which the village is named.

Geography
The village lies at an altitude of 160 metres and covers an area of 8.811 km².
It has a population of about 326 people.

Ethnicity
The village is about 55% Slovak 45% Magyar.

Facilities
The village has a public library and a  football pitch.

Genealogical resources

The records for genealogical research are available at the state archive "Statny

Archiv in Nitra, Slovakia"

 Roman Catholic church records (births/marriages/deaths): 1693-1895 (parish B)
 Lutheran church records (births/marriages/deaths): 1746-1896 (parish B)
 Reformated church records (births/marriages/deaths):1753-1897 (parish A)

See also
 List of municipalities and towns in Slovakia

References

External links
https://web.archive.org/web/20071116010355/http://www.statistics.sk/mosmis/eng/run.html
Surnames of living people in Bory

Villages and municipalities in Levice District